Daniel Sanders (born February 3, 1986) is a former American football center. He was signed by the St. Louis Rams as an undrafted free agent in 2009. He played college football at Colorado.

Professional career

St. Louis Rams
He was signed as an undrafted free agent after the 2009 NFL Draft by the St. Louis Rams, but did not make an appearance during the 2009 NFL season.

Baltimore Ravens
On January 21, 2010, Sanders was signed to a future/reserves contract with the Baltimore Ravens. He was waived on June 17. He was re-signed on August 1.

References

External links
Baltimore Ravens bio
Colorado Buffaloes bio

1986 births
Living people
People from Vista, California
Players of American football from California
Sportspeople from San Diego County, California
American football centers
Colorado Buffaloes football players
St. Louis Rams players
Baltimore Ravens players